Robert Lloyd 'Bob' Bower (1925–2004) was an Australian rugby league player who played in the 1940s and 1950s.

Playing career
Originally from Kurri Kurri, New South Wales, Bower represented New South Wales in 1949 and was offered a contract at St George Dragons the following year. He played four seasons with St. George between 1950 and 1953, his final game being the 1953 Grand Final. He returned to country football the following year.

Bower died on 14 December 2004, 31 days short of his 80th birthday.

References

St. George Dragons players
Australian rugby league players
1925 births
2004 deaths
New South Wales rugby league team players
Country New South Wales rugby league team players
Rugby league props